The men's 400 metres was an event at the 1972 Summer Olympics in Munich. The competition was held on 3, 4 and 7 September. Sixty-four athletes from 49 nations competed. The maximum number of athletes per nation had been set at 3 since the 1930 Olympic Congress. The event was won by Vince Matthews of the United States, the nation's fifth consecutive and 12th overall victory in the event (all by different men). The Americans' hopes to repeat their podium sweep of four years earlier were dashed by injury in the final. Bronze medalist Julius Sang became the first black African to win a sprint Olympic medal, earning Kenya's first medal in the event.

On the victory podium, Vince Matthews and Wayne Collett talked to each other and failed to stand at attention during the medal ceremony. On the advice of Avery Brundage, the IOC banned them from further competition. Since the third American competitor, John Smith, had pulled a hamstring while leading 80 metres into the final and had been ruled unfit to run, the United States were left unable to field a 4 x 400 relay team, and were thus forced to scratch from the event.

Background

This was the seventeenth appearance of the event, which is one of 12 athletics events to have been held at every Summer Olympics. Three finalists, but no medalists, from 1968 returned: fourth-place finisher Amadou Gakou of Senegal, sixth-place Tegegne Bezabeh of Ethiopia, and seventh-place Andrzej Badeński of Poland (who had won bronze in 1964). Despite the complete turnover from their 1968 podium sweep, the United States team was again favored—this time led by John Smith, the 440-yard world record holder and AAU champion.

Benin, Cambodia, the Republic of the Congo, Fiji, Kuwait, Lebanon, Madagascar, Malawi, Paraguay, Peru, Saudi Arabia, and Zambia appeared in this event for the first time. The United States made its seventeenth appearance in the event, the only nation to compete in it at every Olympic Games to that point.

Competition format

The competition retained the basic four-round format from 1920. The "fastest loser" system, introduced in 1964, was applied in the first round and quarterfinals. There were 9, each scheduled to have 7 or 8 athletes but some with only 6 starters. The top four runners in each heat advanced to the quarterfinals along with the next four fastest overall. The 5 quarterfinals each had 8 runners; the top three athletes in each quarterfinal heat advanced to the semifinals, with one spot for the next fastest finisher. The semifinals featured 2 heats of 8 runners each. The top four runners in each semifinal heat advanced, making an eight-man final.

Records

Prior to the competition, the existing World and Olympic records were as follows.

No world or Olympic records were set during this event.

Schedule

All times are Central European Time (UTC+1)

Results

Round 1

The top four runners in each of the nine heats (darker green) and the next four fastest (lighter green), advanced to the quarterfinal round.

Heat 1

Heat 2

Heat 3

Heat 4

Heat 5

Heat 6

Heat 7

Heat 8

Heat 9

Quarterfinals

The top three runners in each of the five heats, and the next fastest, advanced to the semifinal round.

Quarterfinal 1

Quarterfinal 2

Quarterfinal 3

Quarterfinal 4

Quarterfinal 5

Semifinals

Top four in each of the two heats advanced to the final round.

Semifinal 1

Semifinal 2

Final

Smith was leading at 80 metres when he pulled his hamstring and could not finish.

References

External links
Official report

Men's 400 metres
400 metres at the Olympics
Men's events at the 1972 Summer Olympics